The NAIA Men's Soccer Championship is the annual tournament to determine the national champions of NAIA men's collegiate soccer in the United States and Canada. It has been held annually since 1959.

The most successful program is Quincy (IL), with 11 NAIA national titles. 

The current champion is Bethel (IN), which won its first men's national title in 2022.

Results

Notes

Cumulative results

 Schools highlighted in pink are closed or no longer sponsor athletics.
 Schools highlight in yellow have reclassified athletics from the NAIA.

Players

The following players have gone on to play at a professional level after playing in the NAIA competition.

See also
NAIA Women's Soccer Championship
NCAA Men's Soccer Championships (Division I, Division II, Division III)
NCAA Women's Soccer Championships (Division I, Division II, Division III)

References

External links 
 

S
College soccer competitions in the United States
Soccer cup competitions in the United States
College men's soccer in the United States